"Antisemitism is the socialism of fools" is a statement regarding the idea that Jewish "wealth" and "power" is the source of social injustice. According to British historian Richard Evans, it was probably coined by Austrian left-liberal politician Ferdinand Kronawetter, but is commonly attributed to the German social democrat August Bebel and sometimes to Karl Marx. The phrase was in wide circulation among German social democrats by the 1890s. 

In the view of neoconservative philosopher Leo Strauss, Soviet leader Joseph Stalin had considered that, because fools were common, a "socialism of fools" would be a good thing; hence, Strauss argued, Stalin had deliberately cultivated antisemitism.

References

Further reading 
 
 
 
 
 

1890s neologisms
Antisemitism in Austria
Antisemitism in Germany
Opposition to antisemitism
Political quotes
Socialism